Jenuse Mohamed (born 4 February 1984) is an Indian filmmaker and writer, known for his works in Malayalam Cinema. He made his directorial debut with 100 Days of Love starring Dulquer Salmaan and Nithya Menen. The film was a commercial success and was dubbed into Tamil, Telugu and Hindi. His next venture, 9(Nine) starring Prithviraj Sukumaran and Wamiqa Gabbi, was the first South Indian film to be produced by Sony Pictures.

Early life

Jenuse Mohamed was born on 4 February 1984. His father Kamal is a veteran National Award winning filmmaker, known for his work in the Malayalam film industry. Jenuse holds a Master's degree in Film Studies from London Film School. He is also an MBA graduate.

Career

Jenuse started his career as an assistant director in the South Indian film industry. He worked on several ad films during his time at Nirvana Films, headed by Prakash Varma. He then went on to assist his father and many other renowned filmmakers like Lal Jose and Aashiq Abu. In 2015, he debuted as writer and director with 100 Days of Love. The film was a romantic comedy and it was well received not only in Malayalam but also several other languages including in Hindi. In 2019, he directed his second film 9(Nine) which was a science fiction horror film. It was jointly produced by Prithviraj Productions and Sony Pictures.

Filmography

 100 Days of Love
 9 (Nine)

References 

1984 births
Living people
Indian filmmakers
Indian writers
Indian screenwriters
Indian directors